Treholt is a surname. Notable people with the surname include:

Arne Treholt (born 1942), Norwegian former KGB agent 
Thorstein Treholt (1911–1993), Norwegian politician